Azaleothrips is a genus of thrips in the family Phlaeothripidae.

Species
 Azaleothrips amabilis
 Azaleothrips apoensis
 Azaleothrips aspersus
 Azaleothrips atayal
 Azaleothrips bali
 Azaleothrips bhattii
 Azaleothrips bifidius
 Azaleothrips bulelengi
 Azaleothrips dentatus
 Azaleothrips dorsalis
 Azaleothrips flavicollis
 Azaleothrips floresi
 Azaleothrips formosae
 Azaleothrips indonesiensis
 Azaleothrips inflavus
 Azaleothrips laevigatus
 Azaleothrips laocai
 Azaleothrips lepidus
 Azaleothrips lineus
 Azaleothrips lixinae
 Azaleothrips luzonicus
 Azaleothrips magnus
 Azaleothrips malaya
 Azaleothrips mindanaoensis
 Azaleothrips moundi
 Azaleothrips perniger
 Azaleothrips philippinensis
 Azaleothrips phuketanus
 Azaleothrips pulcher
 Azaleothrips reticulatus
 Azaleothrips richardi
 Azaleothrips siamensis
 Azaleothrips simulans
 Azaleothrips sulawesicus
 Azaleothrips taiwanus
 Azaleothrips templeri
 Azaleothrips toshifumii
 Azaleothrips vietnamensis

References

Phlaeothripidae
Thrips
Thrips genera